The Heard-Lakeman House is a historic house at 2 Turkey Shore Road in Ipswich, Massachusetts. Nathaniel and John Heard built this -story wood-frame house in 1776 for Nathaniel to live in. He sold it in 1795 to Richard Lakeman III, member of a seafaring family. The building was a notable object of restoration during the Colonial Revival in the 1920s.

The house was added to the National Register of Historic Places in 1980, and is subject to local preservation restrictions.

See also
National Register of Historic Places listings in Ipswich, Massachusetts
National Register of Historic Places listings in Essex County, Massachusetts

References

Houses in Ipswich, Massachusetts
National Register of Historic Places in Ipswich, Massachusetts
Houses on the National Register of Historic Places in Essex County, Massachusetts
Colonial architecture in Massachusetts
Houses completed in 1776